Larry O'Shea was an Australian rugby league player. A prop or second-row forward, he made a total of four appearances for the Eastern Suburbs in 1941 and 1942, scoring one try.

References

Year of birth missing
Year of death missing
Australian rugby league players
Rugby league props
Rugby league second-rows
Sydney Roosters players